Wollaston is a small village in Shropshire, England, only a quarter of a mile from the Welsh border.

It also was a civil parish, until 2005 when it was abolished and absorbed into the two neighbouring parishes: Alberbury with Cardeston and Westbury.

It is believed that Old Tom Parr was born in, or near, to the village at Winnington at The Glyn, according to the inscription on a brass plaque in the church.

There is a beacon here, by the church, that is to be lit in case of an invasion from Wales.  Immediately west of the church are the earthwork remains of Wollaston Castle, a motte-and-bailey castle.

Half a mile south-east near Bretchel is the site of a small Norman motte castle known as The Beacon.

Previously served by Plas-y-Court Halt railway station on the Cambrian Line.

See also
Listed buildings in Alberbury with Cardeston

External links

Shrewsbury and Atcham borough council

Villages in Shropshire
Shrewsbury and Atcham
Former civil parishes in Shropshire